Dancing Stage Unleashed, or DS Unleashed, was released by Konami Digital Entertainment GmbH to the European Xbox audience on March 12, 2004. A sister release to the North American Dance Dance Revolution Ultramix, it features the same look and feel and the same options as Ultramix, including online play and content download through Xbox Live. Unleashed has a unique soundtrack and features music from Big Brovaz, Blondie and The Wonder Stuff as well as original tracks from Konami's in-house artists. The original release was followed by two sequels, Dancing Stage Unleashed 2 and 3, released May 13, 2005 and March 17, 2006 for the Xbox in Europe.

Gameplay

Music
Songs unique to Dancing State Unleashed:

A Town Called Malice  - The Jam
Alright  - Supergrass
Circles (Just My Good Time) - Busface feat. Mademoiselle EB
Get It On - Intenso Project feat. Lisa Scott-Lee
Hanging On The Telephone - Blondie
Hip Teens Don't Wear Blue Jeans  - Frank Pop Ensemble 	
I See You Baby (Fatboy Slim Radio Edit) - Groove Armada
Hot Stuff  - Donna Summer
Love Machine - Girls Aloud 
Some Girls - Rachel Stevens
Step On - Happy Mondays
Where's Your Head At? 	- Basement Jaxx 
Wonderful Night  - Fatboy Slim

Reception
Dancing Stage Unleashed was a hit in the United Kingdom, with sales above 1 million units by February 2004.

References

External links
Dancing Stage Unleashed at Konami Europe
Dancing Stage Unleashed at DDRer's Stompin' Grounds 

2004 video games
Dance Dance Revolution games
Multiplayer online games
Video games developed in Germany
Xbox-only games
Xbox games